Regular session can be convened by the Speaker based on the:

 resolution of the Assembly,
 resolution of the Council, or 
 proposal of the Government.

Extraordinary sessions must be convened by the Speaker in 15 days based on the:

 request by the 25% of the MPs or
 request of the President of the Republic.

Extraordinary sessions must also be convened by the Speaker on the urgent matters based on the:

 proposal of the Government or
 resolution of the Council,

if Assembly must:

 pass a bill under urgent legislative procedure,
 make a decision on an urgent matter,
 make a decision considering mandates of the MPs, immunity, elections or appointments or
 make a decision based on the Article 92 of the Constitution.

List of session of the 8th National Assembly:

Regular sessions 
Regular sessions are usually held in the 3rd week of the month and last for a week.

1st Regular Session - 22 June 2018, 11:00 

Addresses by President Borut Pahor and Speaker of the 7th National Assembly Milan Brglez.

Matej Tonin (NSi) was elected Speaker with 80 of 90 votes. Commission for Public Office and Elections was formed and Jože Tanko (SDS) was elected president and Tina Heferle (LMŠ) was elected vice-president of the commission. Session was interrupted so that Commission could hold its session to confirm mandates of the MPs. It was continued after the session to elect Speaker.

Officially first round of the election of the new Prime Minister began.

Election of the Speaker

Extraordinary sessions

1st Extraordinary Session - 3 July 2018, 12:00 

Formation of the Committee on Foreign Policy, Committee on EU Affairs and Joint Committee.

2nd Extraordinary Session - 10 July 2018, 12:00

3rd Extraordinary Session - 19 July 2018, 12:00

4th Extraordinary Session - 27 July 2018, 12:00 

Notification of the President of the Republic that he will not propose a candidate for Prime Minister in the first round of elections after Janez Janša and Marjan Šarec let him know that neither of them currently has a majority of votes in the Assembly. Second round of elections of Prime Minister began.

5th Extraordinary Session - 17 and 23 August 2018, 10:00 

Session will began on Friday, 17 August, with election of the Prime Minister Marjan Šarec. Session will be suspended until Thursday, 23 August, when it will continue with elections of Deputy-Speakers.

Election of the Prime Minister

Election of the Deputy-Speaker

6th Extraordinary Session - 23 August 2018, 30 mins after 5th Extraordinary Session

Election of the Deputy-Speaker

Election of the Speaker

7th Extraordinary Session - 29 August 2018, 13:00 

Formation of working bodies, elections of the third Deputy-Speaker and Secretary-General

Election of the Deputy-Speaker

Election of the Secretary-General

8th Extraordinary Session - 13 September 2018, 10:00

Election of the 13th Government

17th Extraordinary Session - 13 December 2018, 12.00

18th Extraordinary Session - 21 December 2018, 9:00

19th Extraordinary Session - 12 February 2019, 10:00

20th Extraordinary Session - 20 March 2019, 11:00

21st Extraordinary Session - 25 April 2019, 9:00

22nd Extraordinary Session - 13 May 2019, 12:00

23rd Extraordinary Session - 17 May 2019, 10:00

24th Extraordinary Session - 21 June 2019, 9:00

Voting on the interpellation

Other sessions

Solemn Session - 24 June 2018, 19:00 
Session on the occasion of the Statehood Day. Address by the Speaker Matej Tonin.

Attended by President of the Republic Borut Pahor, President of the National Council Alojz Kovšca, President of the Constitutional Court Jadranka Sovdat, President of the Supreme Court Damijan Florjančič, former President of the Republic Milan Kučan, Human Rights Ombudsman Vlasta Nussdorfer and others.

See also 

 List of Sessions of the working bodies of the 8th National Assembly of the Republic of Slovenia
Members of the 8th National Assembly of the Republic of Slovenia

References 

Slovenian politicians
National Assembly (Slovenia)
8th National Assembly (Slovenia)